Ben Daniels (born 10 June 1964) is a British actor. Initially a stage actor, Daniels was nominated for an Olivier Award for Best Supporting Actor for Never the Sinner (1991), the Evening Standard Award for Best Actor for 900 Oneonta (1994), Best Actor in the M.E.N. Theatre Awards for Martin Yesterday (1998), and won the 2001 Olivier Award for Best Supporting Actor for his performance in the Arthur Miller play All My Sons.

In 2008, Daniels made his Broadway début in a revival of Les Liaisons Dangereuses, for which he was nominated for the Tony Award for Best Actor in a Play. Daniels has also appeared on popular television series including Cutting It (2002–04), The Virgin Queen (2005), Law & Order: UK (2009–11), The Paradise (2013), House of Cards (2013–14), and The Exorcist (2016–17).

On 1 April 2018 he appeared in the NBC live televised concert rendition of Andrew Lloyd Webber and Tim Rice's rock opera Jesus Christ Superstar as Pontius Pilate. Daniels played Antony Armstrong-Jones, 1st Earl of Snowdon in the third season of Netflix series The Crown. Currently, Daniels stars in the role of Walter Sampson in the Netflix superhero series, Jupiter's Legacy.

Early life 
Daniels was born on 10 June 1964 in Nuneaton, Warwickshire. His father was an engineer at Rolls-Royce and later a grocer, while his mother owned a children's clothes shop. He has recalled: "I was quite a shy child, but quite disruptive as well. I was very sneaky and underhanded."

Daniels was educated at Manor Park School, a state comprehensive school in Nuneaton, near Coventry, in Warwickshire (since closed). According to Daniels, drama lessons at O-levels gave him a voice, and when he attended sixth form studies at Stratford College between 1980 and 1982, doing A-levels in theatre studies and English literature, he attended Royal Shakespeare Company performances. A fellow student recalled that Daniels, whom he knew as Dave, "was very serious about his work, and struck me as incredibly intelligent... you got the sense his mind was working; the cogs were ticking over". Daniels subsequently trained at the London Academy of Music and Dramatic Art (LAMDA) for three years.

Career 
One of Daniels' earliest roles was as Justin Hayward, the lead singer of the Moody Blues, as a teenager in two of the band's music videos, "Your Wildest Dreams" (1986) and "I Know You're Out There Somewhere" (1988). In 1992, he made an appearance in the infamous plane crash episode "Cascade" of the television show Casualty, playing the co-pilot of the doomed plane. He has taken on parts in many British television dramas, such as Robin in The Lost Language of Cranes (1991), the Biblical character Jonathan in the 1997 Emmy-nominated TV film David, the philandering Finn Bevan in Cutting It (2002–2005), and Nicholas Brocklehurst in the BBC television miniseries The State Within (2006). The latter role was notable for an unexpected same-sex kiss between Daniels' character and another person. In 2008 he appeared in Lark Rise to Candleford, a BBC production based on three semi-autobiographical novels about the English countryside written by Flora Thompson.

Daniels has also played a number of real-life characters, such as German State Secretary Dr. Josef Bühler in Conspiracy, a 2001 dramatisation of the Wannsee Conference at which the Final Solution was endorsed. He also played the author and journalist Ian Fleming, creator of James Bond, in Ian Fleming: Bondmaker (2005), as well as Sir Francis Walsingham in The Virgin Queen (2005) and English writer Saki in Who Killed Mrs De Ropp? (2007). In addition, he has made guest appearances in a number of British TV drama series, including Soldier Soldier (1992), A Touch of Frost (1992), Outside Edge (1994), Spooks (2005), and Merlin (2011). In 2017, Daniels made a guest appearance in a Treehouse of Horror episode of The Simpsons as a priest.

Daniels may be most recognisable to American audiences for appearing in the 1996 gay film Beautiful Thing. Daniels portrayed Tony, boyfriend of Sandra, the protagonist Jamie's mother. In an independent film directed by Lavinia Currier titled Passion in the Desert (1997), Daniels played a French soldier named Augustin Robert. The film was nominated for a Golden Seashell award. Other feature films that Daniels has starred in are The Bridge (1992), I Want You (1998), Madeline (1998), and Doom (2005). He was offered roles in the 2000 releases The Patriot and Vertical Limit, but turned them down and stated that "the money was good, but it wasn't for me". Daniels had a brief appearance as General Antoc Merrick in the Star Wars film Rogue One: A Star Wars Story.

Daniels has said that he loves acting on stage because "it's tough and keeps you on your toes as an actor". He appeared in All's Well That Ends Well and As You Like It (1999–2000), and played Mercutio in a 1994 TV adaptation of Romeo and Juliet. Other theatre credits include Waiting for Godot (1994) and 900 Oneonta (1994), which earned him a nomination for Best Actor at the Evening Standard Awards. He also acted in Martin Yesterday (1998), for which he was nominated as Best Actor in the Manchester Evening News Theatre Awards, Naked (1998), Tales From Hollywood (2001), Three Sisters (2003), Iphigenia at Aulis (2004), The God of Hell (2005), and The Wild Duck (2005–2006). In 2006, Daniels appeared in Thérèse Raquin as Laurent, for which a reviewer labelled his performance "riveting". On 1 April 2018, Daniels appeared as Pontius Pilate in the NBC live musical, Jesus Christ Superstar Live in Concert!.
 
Daniels won the Best Supporting Actor award at the Whatsonstage.com Theatregoers' Choice Theatre Awards and the 25th Laurence Olivier Awards in 2001 for his performance in the Arthur Miller play All My Sons. He was first nominated for the latter award earlier in his career, in 1991, for his performance as murderer Richard Loeb in the play Never the Sinner at the Playhouse Theatre. In 2008, Daniels fulfilled a lifetime ambition when he made his Broadway début, headlining as the Vicomte de Valmont in a revival of Les Liaisons Dangereuses. The show opened on 1 May 2008. Daniels was nominated for a Tony Award for Best Performance by a Leading Actor in a Play for his role. He will be on the series Interview with a Vampire.  

Daniels played a reoccurring role in the Netflix series House of Cards (2013-2014) as prominent photographer Adam Galloway.

He also played the role of lawyer Rory Murray in the second season of "Passenger List", a fictional podcast produced by Radiotopia

Personal life 
Daniels has been in a relationship with actor Ian Gelder since 1993. They met during the production of Joe Orton's Entertaining Mr Sloane. The couple reside in South London Daniels was already sure of his orientation in his teens (He once remarked: "Out? I've never been in.") although he did not discuss the matter with his parents because they did not have a very close emotional relationship. He was "cautious about mentioning it when I left drama school, because AIDS was terrifying everyone and there was a huge homophobic backlash". He decided to reveal his homosexuality at the age of 24, while appearing in an all-star benefit performance of Martin Sherman's Bent.

Daniels said in an interview in 2001: "Homophobia is still shockingly prevalent in film and TV. I know I've lost work because of being gay, and it is always an issue. Even on a serious BBC Two drama, there will be some suit in some office going, "Hmmm, isn't he a poof?" I don't consider myself politically gay, but whenever I catch a whiff of that now, I'm on it like a ton of bricks." In 2007, Daniels was ranked number 79 in the annual Pink List of 100 influential gay and lesbian people in Britain published by The Independent on Sunday, down from number 47 in 2006.

In his spare time, he is an amateur painter and a practitioner of Ashtanga yoga. From a young age to his early forties, Daniels suffered from sleep paralysis.

Filmography

Film

Television

Theatre

Awards and nominations

Notes

External links 

 
 Ben Daniels at bbc.co.uk Drama
 Ben Daniels at the Royal National Theatre
 "Ben Daniels on IRC, the logfile..." – transcript of an online chat with Ben Daniels from the Official Dutch Beautiful Thing Fanclub

1964 births
Living people
20th-century English male actors
21st-century English male actors
Male actors from Warwickshire
Alumni of the London Academy of Music and Dramatic Art
English gay actors
English male film actors
English male stage actors
English male television actors
Laurence Olivier Award winners
People from Nuneaton
Theatre World Award winners
English LGBT actors